The tournaments of Handball at the 2023 Central American and Caribbean Games are scheduled to be held from 24 June to 7 July 2023. The venue for the competition is the Multi Gymnasium Don Bosco located in San Salvador.

A total of eight men's and eight women's teams (each consisting up to 14 athletes) will compete in each tournament. This means a total of 224 athletes are scheduled to compete.

The winner and runner-up of each competition will qualify for the 2023 Pan American Games in Santiago, Chile. The third place teams will play against the third-placed teams of the 2022 South American Games playoffs.

Qualification
Eight men's teams and eight women's teams will qualify to compete at the games in each tournament. The host nation (El Salvador) received automatic qualification in both tournaments, along with seven other teams.

Men

Women

Participating nations
The following countries qualified handball teams. The numbers of participants qualified are in parentheses.

 
  (host)

Medal summary

Medalists

References

Handball
2023
Central American and Caribbean Games